A list of films produced by the Israeli film industry in 1975.

1975 releases

Unknown premiere date

See also
1975 in Israel

References

External links
 Israeli films of 1975 at the Internet Movie Database

Israeli
Film
1975